, is an action-adventure game. The player takes the role of Bomberman, who has to defeat monsters and collect items to defeat the four bosses of each area.

Bomberman Quest marks the departure of veteran composer, Jun Chikuma.

Plot

Gameplay

Reception 
The game received an average score of 7.7/10 from GameSpot's users, indicating mostly positive reviews.

References

External links 
 Official page at Hudson Soft's Japan Website

1998 video games
Action-adventure games
Quest
Game Boy Color games
Game Boy Color-only games
Video games developed in Japan
Video games scored by Jun Chikuma
Hudson Soft games
Virgin Interactive games
Multiplayer and single-player video games
Electro Brain games